The Imouraren mine is a large mine located in the northern part of Niger in Agadez Region. Imouraren represents one of the largest uranium reserves in Niger having estimated reserves of 109.1 million tonnes of ore grading 0.06% uranium. It is the site of a uranium mining project involving French company Areva and SOPaMin (Société du Patrimoine des Mines du Niger on behalf of the government of Niger). The U3O8 ore grade at nearby SOMAIR is 14,000 tons at 0.3%,  COMINAK is 29,000 t at 0.4%  and  Imouraren 120,000t at 0.15%.

References

External links
 Orano envisages controversial cost-cutting measures at Imouraren, Africa Intelligence, February 3, 2023 (requires free registration)

Uranium mines in Niger